The 1997 West Virginia Mountaineers football team represented West Virginia University in the 1997 NCAA Division I-A football season. It was the Mountaineers' 105th overall and 7th season as a member of the Big East Conference (Big East). The team was led by head coach Don Nehlen, in his 18th year, and played their home games at Mountaineer Field in Morgantown, West Virginia. They finished the season with a record of seven wins and five losses (7–5 overall, 4–3 in the Big East) and with a loss in the Carquest Bowl against Georgia Tech.

Schedule

Personnel

Game summaries

Marshall

Maryland

Virginia Tech

Syracuse

Pittsburgh

Georgia Tech (Carquest Bowl)

References

West Virginia
West Virginia Mountaineers football seasons
West Virginia Mountaineers football